Against All Odds may refer to:

Film and television
Against All Odds (1924 film), a lost 1924 silent film western
Against All Odds (1984 film), a 1984 film starring Rachel Ward, Jeff Bridges and James Woods
Against All Odds (soundtrack), the soundtrack from the movie
Against All Odds (2011 film), a Swiss documentary
Against All Odds (TV series), a reality television series briefly broadcast on NBC in 1992
Against All Odds, the English title of the 2013 Filipino television series Huwag Ka Lang Mawawala
The Blood of Fu Manchu, a 1968 British crime film retitled for American release in 1969 as Against All Odds
TNA Against All Odds, an annual pay-per-view wrestling event
"Against All Odds" (D:TNG episode), an episode from Degrassi: The Next Generation

Music

Albums and EPs
 Against All Odds (Conflict album), 1989
 Against All Odds, a 2000 album by Take 5
 Against All Odds (Tragedy Khadafi album), 2001
 Against All Oddz (Lethal Bizzle album), 2005
 Against All Oddz (Young Noble and E.D.I. album), 2006
 Against All Odds (N-Dubz album), 2009
 Against All Odds, a 2009 album by aKING
 Against All Odds (EP), 2020 EP by Onefour

Songs
"Against All Odds (Take a Look at Me Now)", a song by Phil Collins, written for the 1984 film of that name
"Against All Odds" (Chase & Status song), from 2009
"Against All Odds", a 1996 song by Tupac Shakur from The Don Killuminati: The 7 Day Theory album

Other uses
Against All Odds (biography), a 2017 book about Edgar Lungu by Anthony Mukwita
Against All Odds (novel), a 2017 book by Danielle Steel
Against All Odds (video game), a 2005 browser-based video game by UNHCR
Against All Odds: My Story, an autobiography by Chuck Norris

See also
Against the Odds (disambiguation)